Robert J. Egan was a Michigan politician.

Political life
The Flint City Commission selected him as mayor for the years 1958-60.

References

Mayors of Flint, Michigan
20th-century American politicians